Javiera Salcedo (born November 29, 1977) is an Argentine former swimmer, who specialized in breaststroke events. She blasted an Argentine record of 1:11.79 to pull off a fifth-place effort in the 100 m breaststroke at the 2007 Pan American Games in Rio de Janeiro, Brazil.

Salcedo qualified for the women's 100 m breaststroke at the 2004 Summer Olympics in Athens, by clearing a FINA B-standard entry time of 1:12.08 from the Spanish Spring Open Championships in Cadiz. She challenged seven other swimmers in heat three, including 15-year-olds Annabelle Carey of New Zealand and Lee Ji-Young of South Korea. She edged out Philippines' Jaclyn Pangilinan to take a fourth spot by one hundredth of a second (0.01) in 1:12.46. Salcedo failed to advance into the semifinals, as she shared a twenty-ninth place tie with Greece's Aikaterini Sarakatsani in the preliminaries.

References

1977 births
Living people
Argentine female swimmers
Olympic swimmers of Argentina
Swimmers at the 1995 Pan American Games
Swimmers at the 2004 Summer Olympics
Swimmers at the 2007 Pan American Games
Argentine female breaststroke swimmers
Sportspeople from Buenos Aires Province
South American Games gold medalists for Argentina
South American Games silver medalists for Argentina
South American Games medalists in swimming
Competitors at the 2006 South American Games
Pan American Games competitors for Argentina
21st-century Argentine women